Yuran Fernandes Rocha Lopes (born 19 October 1994) is a Cape Verdean professional footballer who plays as a centre-back for Liga 1 club PSM Makassar.

Career

PSM Makassar
On 4 June 2022, Yuran Fernandes joined to PSM Makassar for the 2022-23 Liga 1. Yuran made his PSM Makassar debut in a pre-season tournament 2022 Indonesia President's Cup against Arema on 11 June 2022.

Honours

Club
Torreense
 Liga 3: 2021–22

References

External links
 
 

1994 births
Living people
People from Boa Vista, Cape Verde
Association football defenders
Cape Verdean footballers
Cape Verdean expatriate footballers
Expatriate footballers in Portugal
Cape Verdean expatriate sportspeople in Portugal
Expatriate footballers in Indonesia
Expatriate sportspeople in Indonesia
Campeonato de Portugal (league) players
Liga Portugal 2 players
Liga 1 (Indonesia) players
C.F. Os Armacenenses players
Louletano D.C. players
S.C. Olhanense players
C.D. Pinhalnovense players
C.F. Estrela da Amadora players
S.C.U. Torreense players
PSM Makassar players